The Escuela Colombiana de Ingeniería (Spanish for Colombian School of Engineering) Julio Garavito is a private engineering-based university. The school is located on a  campus in a beautiful natural environment in the north part of Bogotá and has approximately 4,600 students in undergraduate and graduate programs. It includes laboratories, computer systems, one of the largest collections of engineering texts and journals in Colombia as well as international and national access to information via the internet.

History 

Taking its name from Colombian engineer and astronomer Julio Garavito, the school was founded on October 20, 1972, when the constitution act of the Colombian School of Engineering was signed.

The first established program was the Civil Engineering, followed by the Electric and Systems (Computer Science) Engineering. Later, the Industrial Engineering, Electronics Engineering and Economics programs were added.

In 2002 the Board of directors approved the creation of the Administration and International business program.

The school's structure has diversified ever since offering several additional courses and specializations.

The teachers and engineers who founded the school are:

Luis Guillermo Aycardi Barrero
Jorge Eduardo Estrada Villegas
Manuel García López
Gonzalo Jiménez Escobar
Ernesto Obregón Torres
Armando Palomino Infante
Ricardo Quintana Sighinolfi
Ricardo Rincón Hernández
Alejandro Sandino Pardo
Ignacio Umaña de Brigard
Jairo Uribe Escamilla.

The foundation act was signed also by the following Colombian entrepreneurs, who contributed to the initiation and foundation of the school as benefactors:

Jaime Michelsen Uribe
Bernardo Pizano Brigard
Javier Ramírez Soto
Bernardo Saiz de Castro
Luis Carlos Sarmiento Angulo
Luis Alberto Serna Cortés.

In January 1973 the founders told about the school foundation and the start of academics labors with 88 students on March 20 of the same year.

Academics 

The Escuela Colombiana de Ingeniería offers, as of 2007, eight undergraduate programs. It has approximately 4,600 students in undergraduate and graduate programs

Undergraduate programs

 Civil Engineering
 Mechanical Engineering
 Electrical Engineering
 Electronic Engineering
 Systems Engineering (Computer Science/Software Engineering)
 Industrial Engineering
 Economy
 Administration (with emphasis in business and international finances)
 Mathematics

Academic programs are 10 semesters long with the exception of the Economics and the Administration programs which are 9 semesters.

Specializations (graduate programs)

 Project Management and Development
 Design, Construction and Conservation of Highways
 Structures
 Hydraulic Resources and the Environment
 Environmental Sanitation
 Economics for Engineers
 Telecommunications and e-business

References

Escuela de Ingenieria
Science and technology in Colombia
Scientific organisations based in Colombia